The International Field Archery Association (IFAA), is an amateur sports association that  represents 50,000 field archers in 40 member countries.  It was founded in 1970.

IFAA promotes competition between international and national associations and formulates the rules governing international competition. It creates programmes that recognise archers for proficiency in all IFAA sanctioned competitions.

IFAA creates standards that differentiate between the amateur status and professional status of archers for competition as conducted by and/or sanctioned by the Association. It promotes the  development, instruction, coaching and spreading of expertise.

External links
 International Field Archery Association website
 English Field Archery Association website
 New Zealand Field Archery Association
 South African National Archery Association
 Welsh Field Archery Association

Archery organizations
International sports organizations